Diego Dubcovsky (born Buenos Aires) is an Argentine film producer.

He works in the cinema of Argentina.

In 1995, he launched his own production company together with Daniel Burman, BD Cine (Burman and Dubcovsky Cine).

En 2015 he created the company Varsovia Films.
He has produced more than 50 films.

He is also a poker player. 

In 2022 he published his first book, Motorhome.

Filmography
Producer
 Pájaros prohibidos (1995)
 Plaza de almas (1997)
 Ezeiza (1997) (short)
 Un Crisantemo Estalla en Cinco Esquinas (1998) a.k.a. A Crysanthemum Bursts in Cincoesquinas
 Los Libros y la noche (1999) a.k.a. The Books and the Night
 Río escondido (1999) a.k.a. Hidden River
 Garage Olimpo (1999)
 Todas Las Azafatas Van Al Cielo (2002) a.k.a. Every Stewardess Goes to Heaven
 Fuckland (2000) a.k.a. F—kland
 Esperando al Mesías (2000) a.k.a. Waiting for the Messiah
 Nadar solo (2003)
 18-J (2004)
 El Abrazo Partido (2004) a.k.a. Lost Embrace
 Diarios de motocicleta (2004) a.k.a. The Motorcycle Diaries
 Como un avión estrellado (2005)
 Un Año sin amor (2005) A Year Without Love
 Mientras tanto (2006)
 Chicha tu madre (2006)
 Derecho de Familia (2006) a.k.a. Family Law
Encarnación (2007)
Alanis (2017)
 Sangre blanca (2018)
 Casa Coraggio (2018)
 Malambo, el hombre bueno (2018)
 Breve historia del planeta verde (2019)
 Los miembros de la familia (2019)
 De nuevo otra vez (2019)
Edición ilimitada (2020)
 Las mil y una (2020)
 El método Tangalanga (2022)

References

External links
 

Argentine Jews
Argentine film producers
Living people
People from Buenos Aires
Argentine production designers
Year of birth missing (living people)
Jewish film people